Shakur Welcome (born 29 January 1997) is a Caymanian footballer. On 23 March 2020, Welcome received a 3-year ban from the Cayman Islands Football Association for throwing a ball at an assistant referee during a 23 January match of the 2019–20 Premier League against Academy SC.

As well as playing football, Welcome has also represented the Cayman Islands under-19 rugby team.

Career statistics

International

References

1997 births
Living people
Association football goalkeepers
Caymanian footballers
Caymanian rugby union players
Cayman Athletic SC players
Bodden Town F.C. players
Cayman Islands Premier League players
Cayman Islands international footballers
Cayman Islands under-20 international footballers